Battery D, 1st West Virginia Light Artillery Regiment was an artillery battery that served in the Union Army during the American Civil War.

Service
Battery D  was organized at Wheeling in western Virginia on August 20, 1862.

Battery D was mustered out on June 27, 1865.

Casualties
The 1st West Virginia Light Artillery Regiment lost 33 men, killed and died of wounds; 131 men, died of disease, accident or in prison; total deaths, 164 men. (all 8 batteries)

[Source: Regimental Losses in the American Civil War, 1861–1865, by William F. Fox]

Commander
Captain John Carlin

References
The Civil War Archive

See also
West Virginia Units in the Civil War
West Virginia in the Civil War

Units and formations of the Union Army from West Virginia
Artillery units and formations of the American Civil War
1862 establishments in Virginia
Military units and formations established in 1862
Military units and formations disestablished in 1865